Makato, officially the Municipality of Makato (Aklanon: Banwa it Makato; Hiligaynon: Banwa sang Makato), is a 4th class municipality in the province of Aklan, Philippines. According to the 2020 census, it has a population of 29,717 people.

Established in the thirteenth century, the town’s name had been acquired by accident. Thinking that the Spaniards came to ask the route along the river, the native answered “Makato” which meant “that way”. The Spaniards recorded the name Makato on the year Eighteen Hundred (1800) thinking it was the name of the town. In 1901, the town merged with Tangalan to form the new municipality of Taft, named after the then United States President, William Howard Taft. But in 1923, Respresentative Manuel Terencio of Capiz, authored a law restoring its former name. In 1948, the arrabal of Tangalan, comprising the barrios of Tondog, Jawili, Dumatad, Afga, Baybay, Dapdap, Pudyot, Tagas, Tamalagon, Panayakan, Vivo, Lanipga, Napatag and Tamoko, was separated from Makato to form the municipality of Tangalan.

Geography

According to the Philippine Statistics Authority, the municipality has a land area of  constituting  of the  total area of Aklan.

Climate

Barangays
Makato is politically subdivided into 18 barangays.

Demographics

In the 2020 census, Makato had a population of 29,717.

Economy

Religion 

Domicile of the Santo Niño and Ati-atihan Festival known throughout the province and a week ahead of Kalibo, Makato has been celebrating the “Mother of all Philippine Festivals” in admiration of the Holy Child.

Government

Elected officials
Mayor:  Ramon Anselmo Martin D. Legaspi III

Vice Mayor:  Leoncito Y. Mationg

Sangguniang Bayan Members:
 Nilo M. Amboboyog
 Marcosa T. Rusia
 Marlene Blaire T. Igham
 Bob Augusto F. Legaspi
 Nerli F. Dela Cena
 Lorenz Michael C. Terencio
 Guia S. Amboboyog

Liga ng Barangay (LnB): Bobby Clyde Legaspi

Sangguniang Kabataan Federation: Dina Mae Taladro

The Incumbent Mayor Abencio T. Torres has passed away last May 28, 2022. He was replaced by Vice Mayor Ramon D. Legaspi III who was the Mayor-Elect.

Sangguniang Bayan Member Nilo Amboboyog will be the Temporary Vice Mayor until June 30, 2022 and will replaced by top SB Member Leoncito "Langkoy" Mationg.

Nerli F. Dela Cena was a Former Vice Mayor of Makato from 2010 - 2016 and succeeded by Bob Augusto F. Legaspi who became Vice Mayor of Makato from 2016 - 2019. Both of them were elected as Sangguniang Bayan Member in 2022 Philippine general election

Infrastructure
The Aklan Sports Complex (Opened in 2010) was located here at Makato, where the 2010 Western Visayas Regional Athletic Association (WVRAA) Meet takes place.

References

External links
 [ Philippine Standard Geographic Code]

Municipalities of Aklan